The Yellow Mask is a 1930 British musical crime film directed by Harry Lachman and starring Lupino Lane, Dorothy Seacombe and Warwick Ward. A criminal plans to rob the Crown Jewels from the Tower of London. It was based on the 1927 Edgar Wallace novel The Traitor's Gate., adapted into the play The Yellow Mask, which premiered in London in 1928.

Cast
Lupino Lane as Sam Slipper
Dorothy Seacombe as Mary Trayne
Warwick Ward as Li San
Haddon Mason as Ralph Carn
Wilfred Temple as John Carn
Frank Cochrane as Ah-Song
Wallace Lupino as Steward
Bill Shine (actor) as Sunshine
Winnie Collins as Molly

Reception
Daily Telegraph wrote, "provides an hour's ideal entertainment"; and the Sunday Pictorial called it, "packed with every known ingredient of popularity." The New York Times wrote, "in a prologue to the film it is set forth that Mr. Wallace has attempted a daring and original combination of melodrama and musical comedy in a manner to end all musical melodramas forever. In all likelihood these designations were put upon The Yellow Mask after it had emerged from the studio, in a hasty effort to give this hodge-podge a meaning."

References

External links

1930 films
1930 crime films
Films based on works by Edgar Wallace
Films directed by Harry Lachman
Films set in London
British black-and-white films
1930 musical films
British crime films
British musical films
Films shot at British International Pictures Studios
1930s English-language films
1930s British films